Wilkerson House may refer to:

Wilkerson House (Evening Shade, Arkansas), listed on the National Register of Historic Places in Sharp County, Arkansas
Wilkerson House (Holly Springs, Mississippi), listed on the National Register of Historic Places in Marshall County, Mississippi